109 (one hundred [and] nine) is the natural number following 108 and preceding 110.

In mathematics
109 is the 29th prime number. As 29 is itself prime, 109 is the tenth super-prime. The previous prime is 107, making them both twin primes. 

109 is a centered triangular number.

There are exactly:

109 different families of subsets of a three-element set whose union includes all three elements.
109 different loops (invertible but not necessarily associative binary operations with an identity) on six elements.
109 squares on an infinite chessboard that can be reached by a knight within three moves.

There are 109 uniform edge-colorings to the 11 regular and semiregular (or Archimedean) tilings.

The decimal expansion of 1/109 can be computed using the alternating series, with  the  Fibonacci number:

The decimal expansion of 1/109 has 108 digits, making 109 a full reptend prime in decimal. The last six digits of the 108-digit cycle are 853211, the first six Fibonacci numbers in descending order.

See also
109 (disambiguation)

References

Integers